is a Japanese dancer, model and actress. She is a former member of Flower and E-girls, former model for Hanachu and an exclusive model for Seventeen. Nozomi is represented with LDH.

Early life 
Nozomi was born in Tokyo in 1997. She has an older brother. From the age of 3 Bando started to learn classical ballet and attended Masako Ono Ballet Studio during her second grade in elementary school. She also started hip-hop dancing and was scouted in Odaiba during her 4th year in elementary school, her entrance to attending the Exile Professional Gym (EXPG) in Tokyo.

In 2010, Bando made her model debut in the fashion magazine Hanachu and served as an exclusive model until she went on hiatus in May 2011.

Career
For more information, see Flower (Japanese band) § History

On July 26, 2011, it was revealed during an E-Girls SHOW event in SHIBUYA-AX, that Nozomi passed the dance performance department of the Exile Presents VOCAL BATTLE AUDITION 3 ~For Girls~ and was added to Flower as a performer alongside Harumi Sato. On that same day, she was also added as a member to E-girls, having a concurrent position in the group and Flower. On August 30, she became an exclusive model for the fashion magazine Seventeen after winning the Miss Seventeen 2011 audition along with Yua Shinkawa, Ayami Nakajo and Ai Hashizume. On October 12, Flower made their debut with the single "Still".

In July 2012, Nozomi made her acting debut in the Kansai Telecasting Corporation drama GTO.

In April 2015 she ended her work as an exclusive model for Seventeen.

On January 12, 2018, Nozomi was announced as one of the cast members for the live-action adaptation of the manga Rainbow Days (虹色デイズ Nanairo Days). The movie stars her label mate Reo Sano, member of Generations from Exile Tribe, and was released on July 6. On May 30 in the same year, it was also announced Nozomi would play one of the leading roles in the short film Kuu alongside her group members Anna Ishii and Nonoka Yamaguchi from E-girls. The short film was part of LDH's Utamonogatari -CINEMA FIGHTERS project- (ウタモノガタリ -CINEMA FIGHTERS project-).

On April 15, 2019, Nozomi was announced to be part of the cast for the movie Three Nobunaga (3人の信長) which stars Exile Takahiro playing the main character and will be released on September 20. On April 23 in the same year, she was chosen as one of the representative E-girls members alongside Harumi Sato, Kaede Dobashi and Nonoka Yamaguchi for the advertisements of Mister Donut's Tapoica Drink "Tap！Tap！Tapioca！", a new product released on the same day.

On September 10, 2019, it was announced that she would be on the cover for the 12th issue of the Japanese fashion magazine Please, making it her first solo cover in her career.

Personal life
Bando is friends with Ikumi Hisamatsu when working for Hanachu, and she was nicknamed  by Hisamatsu.

Filmography
To see her appearances with Flower, see Flower (Japanese band); To see her appearances with E-girls, see E-girls

TV dramas

Films

Stage

Music videos

Commercials

Other work

Runways

Magazines

Awards

References

External links
 
 

Japanese female models
Japanese female dancers
21st-century Japanese actresses
People from Tokyo
1997 births
Living people
LDH (company) artists
Models from Tokyo Metropolis